Bernard John McGarry (5 August 1881 – 19 November 1967) was an Australian rules footballer who played for the St Kilda Football Club in the Victorian Football League (VFL).

Notes

External links 

1881 births
1967 deaths
Australian rules footballers from Melbourne
St Kilda Football Club players
People from Footscray, Victoria